Summit is a historic home located in Catonsville, Baltimore County, Maryland.  It a large brick house, once part of a country estate owned by James Albert Gary. It features a three-story Italianate tower and large wing extending to the rear. The main façade is three stories and five bays wide, with the tower located on the east side. A one-story porch with square columns and railings runs across the full façade. The mansion was built originally as a summer home and later converted to apartments after its sale to the Summit Park Company in 1919.

It was listed on the National Register of Historic Places in 1979.

References

External links
, including photo from 1977, at Maryland Historical Trust

Catonsville, Maryland
Houses in Baltimore County, Maryland
Houses on the National Register of Historic Places in Maryland
Houses completed in 1854
Italianate architecture in Maryland
Second Empire architecture in Maryland
National Register of Historic Places in Baltimore County, Maryland
1854 establishments in Maryland